Lyncina leviathan is a species of tropical sea snail, a cowry, a marine gastropod mollusk in the family Cypraeidae, the cowries.

Description
The dorsum surface of these elongated, smooth and shiny shells is pink-salmon, crossed by darker bands. The base is whitish or pale pinkish or pale brown, with a long and wide aperture with several teeth. In the living cowries the mantle is brownish, almost transparent and well developed, with external antennae and several  sensorial tree-shaped papillae. This species is superficially similar to Lyncina carneola.

Distribution
Lyncina leviathan is common throughout the tropical Indian (East Africa, Red Sea) and the central Pacific Oceans, in the sea along Thailand, Australia, Polynesia and Hawaii.

Habitat

Subspecies
Three subspecies are known:
 Lyncina leviathan leviathan  Schilder & Schilder, 1937- leviathan cowry, endemic to Hawaii
 Lyncina leviathan bouteti  Burgess & Arnette, 1981- Boutet's leviathan cowry, found throughout Polynesia
 Lyncina leviathan titan Schilder & Schilder, 1962- titanic cowry, found throughout the Indian and central Pacific Oceans

References

 Lorenz F. & Hubert A. (2000) A guide to worldwide cowries. Edition 2. Hackenheim: Conchbooks. 584 pp
 Burgess, C.M. (1970). The Living Cowries. AS Barnes and Co, Ltd. Cranbury, New Jersey

Bibliography
Cowrie Genetic Database Project

External links
 Biolib
 On-line articles with Cypraea leviathan in the HAWAIIAN SHELL NEWS (1960-1994) Hawaiian shell
 Clade
 Underwater

Cypraeidae
Gastropods described in 1937